Fort Niagara Light is an inactive lighthouse on the Niagara River on the south shore of Lake Ontario in New York state. It is located on the grounds of Fort Niagara.

History
The lighthouse was established in 1769 atop the "French Castle", a structure still located within Old Fort Niagara. The current tower was first lit in 1872, having been removed from the French Castle to allow for more room for officer's quarters.  The light was deactivated in 1996, having been replaced by a light beacon at the US Coast Guard Station Niagara.

The foundation was natural/emplaced and the lighthouse was constructed out of limestone with a brick lining.  The tower is octagonal in shape with a black lantern.  The original lens was a fourth order Fresnel lens installed in 1859

National Register Status: LISTED; Reference #84002809
Name of Listing: FORT NIAGARA LIGHT (U.S. COAST GUARD/GREAT LAKES TR)

Part of Old Fort Niagara National Historic Landmark;  First two towers constructed on the fort; Third (current) tower constructed south of fort; Tower replaced by modern beacon in order to save trees obstructing lantern in 1993.

Cultural
The Archives Center at the Smithsonian National Museum of American History has a collection (#1055) of souvenir postcards of lighthouses and has digitized 272 of these and made them available online.  These include postcards of Fort Niagara Light  with links to customized nautical charts provided by National Oceanographic and Atmospheric Administration.

See also 
 Fort Niagara

References

Further reading
 Oleszewski, Wes. Great Lakes Lighthouses, American and Canadian: A Comprehensive Directory/Guide to Great Lakes Lighthouses, (Gwinn, Michigan: Avery Color Studios, Inc., 1998) .
 
 U.S. Coast Guard. Historically Famous Lighthouses (Washington, D.C.: Government Printing Office, 1957).
 Wright, Larry and Wright, Patricia. Great Lakes Lighthouses Encyclopedia Hardback (Erin: Boston Mills Press, 2006)

External links
 Fort Niagara Lighthouse at American Byways

Lighthouses completed in 1782
Lighthouses completed in 1872
Lighthouses in New York (state)
1782 establishments in the British Empire
Transportation buildings and structures in Niagara County, New York
Lighthouses of the Great Lakes